Umrao Jaan may refer to:
 Umrao Jan Ada (1972 film), a Pakistani film
 Umrao Jaan (1981 film), a Bollywood film 
 Umrao Jaan (2006 film), a Bollywood film
 Umrao Jan Ada (2003 TV series), a Pakistani TV series

See also
 Umrao Jaan Ada, an 1899 novel